Einar Bakke Håndlykken (born 9 August 1976 in Trondheim, Norway) is a Norwegian environmentalist and director of Zero Emission Resource Organisation (ZERO). Håndlykken started with environmentalism as a youth in Grenland Natur og Ungdom, and became deputy chairman of the national organisation in 1997 and in 1999 and 2000 he was chairman. He worked for Bellona from 2001 to 2002, when he co-founded ZERO.

References

1976 births
Living people
Norwegian environmentalists
Nature and Youth activists